Carlos Alexandre Fortes Alhinho (10 January 1949 – 31 May 2008) was a Portuguese professional football central defender and manager.

He was one of the few players in his generation to have played for the Big Three in Portugal – Sporting, Benfica and Porto. Over 15 seasons, he amassed Primeira Liga totals of 337 matches and 17 goals.

Prior to his death in 2008, Alhinho worked as a coach for more than 20 years, in numerous clubs and countries.

Club career
Born in São Vicente, Cape Verde, Alhinho moved to Portugal shortly after. He made his professional debut with Académica de Coimbra in the 1968–69 season after having joined its youth system at the age of 16 from Académica do Mindelo, appearing in 14 matches as the team finished in sixth position in the Primeira Liga.

After three further seasons in Coimbra, Alhinho signed for Sporting CP, winning his first national championship in 1973–74 and never missing a game in two of his three seasons. In 1975 he moved to La Liga side Real Betis but, unsettled, returned to his country of adoption a mere months after, joining FC Porto.

In the next five years, Alhinho would be mainly linked contractually to S.L. Benfica, winning another league in 1976–77. During his tenure, however, he also played in Belgium with R.W.D. Molenbeek– rejoining his former club after one season – and in the North American Soccer League for the New England Tea Men, loaned.

Aged 33, Alhinho left Benfica, played three more years in the Portuguese top flight, with Portimonense S.C. and S.C. Farense (without ever suffering relegation) and retired from football. He immediately started coaching, with modest Lusitano GC; in the following 22 years he managed teams in Portugal (two in the top division), Morocco, Angola, Qatar, Bahrain and Saudi Arabia.

International career
Alhinho represented Portugal internationally, earning 15 caps over a period of nine years. His debut came on 28 March 1973 in a 1–1 draw with Northern Ireland for the 1974 FIFA World Cup qualifiers, and his last game happened on 5 May 1982 in a 1–3 friendly loss with Brazil.

In one of his first coaching jobs, in 1985, Alhinho managed the Cape Verdean national team, working with Angola nine years later and again in 2000.

Death
On 31 May 2008, Alhinho opened the doors of the elevator on the sixth floor of his hotel in Benguela and stepped in, only to find the carriage was not there but on the ground floor. He plunged five floors onto the top of the cabin and, despite receiving immediate medical attention, died shortly afterwards at the age of 59.

References

Further reading
Rui Miguel Tovar, 101 Cromos da Bola, Leya, 2012 ,

External links

NASL career stats

1949 births
2008 deaths
People from São Vicente, Cape Verde
Portuguese sportspeople of Cape Verdean descent
Portuguese footballers
Cape Verdean footballers
Association football forwards
Académica do Mindelo players
Primeira Liga players
Associação Académica de Coimbra – O.A.F. players
Sporting CP footballers
FC Porto players
S.L. Benfica footballers
Portimonense S.C. players
S.C. Farense players
Real Betis players
Belgian Pro League players
R.W.D. Molenbeek players
North American Soccer League (1968–1984) players
New England Tea Men players
Portugal under-21 international footballers
Portugal international footballers
Portuguese expatriate footballers
Cape Verdean expatriate footballers
Expatriate footballers in Belgium
Expatriate footballers in Spain
Expatriate soccer players in the United States
Portuguese expatriate sportspeople in Angola
Portuguese expatriate sportspeople in Belgium
Portuguese expatriate sportspeople in Spain
Portuguese expatriate sportspeople in the United States
Cape Verdean expatriate sportspeople in Angola
Cape Verdean expatriate sportspeople in Belgium
Cape Verdean expatriate sportspeople in Spain
Cape Verdean expatriate sportspeople in the United States
Cape Verdean football managers
Portuguese football managers
Primeira Liga managers
Liga Portugal 2 managers
Académico de Viseu F.C. managers
F.C. Penafiel managers
Portimonense S.C. managers
Segunda División managers
CD Badajoz managers
AS FAR (football) managers
Cape Verde national football team managers
Angola national football team managers
Al-Muharraq SC managers
1996 African Cup of Nations managers
Portuguese expatriate football managers
Expatriate football managers in Angola
Expatriate football managers in Morocco
Expatriate football managers in Spain
Expatriate football managers in Qatar
Expatriate football managers in Bahrain
Expatriate football managers in Saudi Arabia
Accidental deaths from falls
Accidental deaths in Angola
Portuguese people of Cape Verdean descent